Ksenofont Alexeyevich Polevoy (1 August 1801, Irkutsk, Imperial Russia, – 21 April 1867, Tyukhmenevo, Smolensk Governorate, Imperial Russia) was a Russian writer, literary critic, journalist, publisher and translator. He was the younger brother of the writers Yekaterina Avdeyeva and Nikolai Polevoy.

Among the biographies Ksenofont Polevoy authored were those of Mikhail Lomonosov (1836, praised by Vissarion Belinsky) and Ivan Khemnitser (1838), as well as his brother, whom he idolized  (The Notes on the Life and Works by Nikolai Polevoy, 1888). In 1835–1839 he translated from French 16 volumes of Memoires ou souvenirs historiques (1831) by Laure Junot. In 1825–1834 he co-edited (with Nikolai Polevoy) Moskovsky Telegraf, in 1835–1838 Zhivopisnoe obozrenie, then a yearly almanac.

References 

Writers from Irkutsk
Russian critics
Journalists from the Russian Empire
Russian male journalists
Male writers from the Russian Empire
1801 births
1867 deaths
19th-century translators from the Russian Empire